Robosapien: Rebooted (also known as Cody the Robosapien) is a 2013 Canadian–American science fiction family drama film starring Bobby Coleman, Holliston Coleman, Penelope Ann Miller, David Eigenberg, Joaquim de Almeida, Kim Coates, Jae Head and Peter Jason, produced by Arad Productions Inc., Arc Productions, Crystal Sky Pictures and Brookwell McNamara Entertainment and distributed by Anchor Bay Films and TVA Films. It is based on the toy Robosapien.

Produced by Avi Arad and Steven Paul, written by Max Botkin from a story by Arad and directed by Sean McNamara with music by John Coda, the film is about a young boy who befriends a robot. The film was theatrically released on May 28, 2013 by Anchor Bay Films and TVA Films.

Plot 

At Kinetech Labs, an inventor named Allan Topher designs a robot for search and rescue, but when he finds out that the robot will be used for military purposes, he programs the robot to flee.  The robot escapes but is damaged in the process. It is discovered by 12-year-old Henry Keller, who fixes it and names it Cody. The robot does not remember its past, and Henry and Cody develop a friendship. Eventually, Cody regains his memory and Henry gives Cody back. The inventor feels guilty for taking Cody away, so he returns the robot to Henry. Allan meets Henry's mother, Joanna, and they get along really well. Kinetech finds and corners Cody and Henry. Cody activates another function of his, and takes off with Henry, flying high up into the sky. They reunite with Meagan but when they call their mother, they find out that Kinetech has kidnapped both their mother and Allan so that they can get the robot back. Meagan, Henry and Cody embark to save them and to bring down Kinetech.

Cast
The film's cast includes:
 Bobby Coleman as Henry Keller
 Holliston Coleman as Meagan Keller, Henry's sister
 Penelope Ann Miller as Joanna Keller, Henry's mother
 David Eigenberg as Allan Topher, Cody's father/Robosapien's creator
 Joaquim de Almeida as Esperenza
 Kim Coates as Niles Porter, Allan's boss
 Buddy Lewis as Charles 
 Jae Head as Cody/Robosapien (voice)
 Peter Jason as Rear Admiral Victor
 Billy Slaughter as James
 Robbie E. Harrison as Warren
  Erin Woods as Jenna

Production
In March 2007, WowWee, the company that makes the toy Robosapien, announced that it planned to produce a feature film about the toy that would combine live-action and computer-generated elements. WowWee entered a partnership with Arad Productions, run by producer Avi Arad, who was interested in Robosapien since the toy debuted. Time reported the planned film as part of a growing trend to make films based on toys, citing the 2007 releases Transformers and Bratz: The Movie. Arad took an active role in developing the lead character for the film. He worked very closely with Art Director Shane Nakamura and the design team at WowWee. In August 2008, feature film rights were officially sold by WowWee to producer duo Arad and Steven Paul, the latter producing films under Crystal Sky Pictures. The film was revealed to be titled Robosapien: Rebooted, and in the negotiation, WowWee reserved the worldwide right to market toys related to the film and to receive a portion of returns for other merchandise related to the film. Sean McNamara was hired to direct the film. Filming took place in New Orleans in 2008 from March 24-April 25. The city was chosen because Arad became familiar with it when he attended National Association of Television Program Executives conventions there in the 1980s and 1990s.  He also chose the city to take advantage of tax breaks and its scenery; the story was also rewritten so it would recognizably take place in New Orleans. In September 2010, Arc Productions (formerly Starz Animation) joined the project with Crystal Sky and Arad Productions.

Release
Robosapien: Rebooted was originally scheduled to be released in 2009. The film was released in the US on May 28, 2013. A Facebook page and new trailer were posted online in early April 2013.
In England, where the toy was a huge success, it wasn't released until July 28, 2014 as an ASDA exclusive DVD.

Reception

Box office
Robosapien: Rebooted has a box office total of $290,502.

During its original release it made $288,055.

A 2015 Re-release made $2,447
The top grossing countries  were Mexico ($191,504), Peru ($54,817) and Singapore ($36,178).

See also

 RoboSapien

References

External links
 
 

2013 films
2010s science fiction comedy films
American science fiction comedy films
Films based on toys
Films directed by Sean McNamara
Films shot in New Orleans
Films with live action and animation
American independent films
WowWee
Crystal Sky Pictures films
2013 independent films
2013 comedy films
2010s English-language films